Therese's shrew (Crocidura theresae) is a species of mammal in the family Soricidae. It is found in Ivory Coast, Ghana, Guinea, Liberia, and Sierra Leone. Its natural habitats are subtropical or tropical moist lowland forest and moist savanna.

References

Therese's shrew
Mammals of West Africa
Therese's shrew
Taxonomy articles created by Polbot
Taxa named by Henri Heim de Balsac